Christos Germanos (born April 28, 1974) is a former international Cypriot football defender.

He played in teams such as Evagoras, APOEL, AEL Limassol but his main career was in Apollon Limassol where he played seven years totally.

External links
 

1974 births
Living people
APOEL FC players
AEL Limassol players
Apollon Limassol FC players
Cypriot footballers
Cyprus international footballers
Association football defenders
Sportspeople from Limassol